WEC 46:  Varner vs. Henderson was a mixed martial arts event held by World Extreme Cagefighting on January 10, 2010. It took place at the ARCO Arena in Sacramento, California.

Background
Mark Hominick was scheduled to face Yves Jabouin on this card, but Jabouin has been forced off the card with an injury.  Jabouin was replaced by WEC newcomer Bryan Caraway. Hominick and Jabouin would later face off at WEC 49 on June 20, 2010, with Hominick winning via TKO.

Wagnney Fabiano was scheduled to fight Frank Gomez at this event, however Gomez withdrew with an undisclosed injury and was replaced by Clint Godfrey. The Fabiano/Gomez bout was also rescheduled for WEC 49, where Fabiano won by unanimous decision.

Bantamweight contests pitting Eddie Wineland against Rafael Rebello and WEC newcomer George Roop against the returning Jesse Moreng were both scratched from this card after Rebello and Moreng both withdrew from the event. Rather than find new opponents, Wineland and Roop were instead matched up against each other on this card.

A lightweight bout between Dave Jansen and Bendy Casimir was once linked to this event, though it was later confirmed that Jansen would instead be facing Kamal Shalorus.

This was the last WEC card to feature former UFC Heavyweight Champion Frank Mir on color commentary. He was officially replaced in April 2010 by Stephan Bonnar, who had filled in for Mir at WEC 47 due to training commitments.

The event drew an estimated 640,000 viewers on Versus.

Results

Bonus Awards

Fighters were awarded $10,000 bonuses.

Fight of the Night:  Coty Wheeler vs.  Will Campuzano
Knockout of the Night: Not awarded as no matches ended with knockout
Submission of the Night:  Urijah Faber

Reported payout 
The following is the reported payout to the fighters as reported to the California State Athletic Commission. It does not include sponsor money or "locker room" bonuses often given by the WEC and also do not include the WEC's traditional "fight night" bonuses.

Benson Henderson: $22,000 (includes $11,000 win bonus) def. Jamie Varner: $18,000 
Urijah Faber: $52,000 ($26,000 win bonus) def. Raphael Assunção: $13,000 
Kamal Shalorus: $10,000 ($5,000 win bonus) def. Dave Jansen: $4,000 
Mike Brown: $38,000 ($19,000 win bonus) def. Anthony Morrison: $4,000 
Deividas Taurosevičius: $14,000 ($7,000 win bonus) def. Mackens Semerzier: $4,000 
Charlie Valencia: $18,000 ($9,000 win bonus) def. Akitoshi Tamura: $8,000 
Wagnney Fabiano: $30,000 ($15,000 win bonus) def. Clint Godfrey: $3,000 
Mark Hominick: $10,000 ($5,000 win bonus) def. Bryan Caraway: $4,000 
Eddie Wineland: $8,000 ($4,000 win bonus) def. George Roop: $3,000 
Will Campuzano: $6,000 ($3,000 win bonus) def. Coty Wheeler: $3,000

See also
 World Extreme Cagefighting
 List of World Extreme Cagefighting champions
 List of WEC events
 2010 in WEC

External links
Official WEC website

References

World Extreme Cagefighting events
Events in Sacramento, California
2010 in mixed martial arts
Mixed martial arts in Sacramento, California
Sports competitions in Sacramento, California
2010 in sports in California